Silene media is a species of flowering plant in the family Caryophyllaceae, native to Ukraine, parts of Russia, and Kazakhstan. It prefers to grow in un-flooded sandy soils.

References

media
Flora of Ukraine
Flora of South European Russia
Flora of East European Russia
Flora of West Siberia
Flora of Kazakhstan
Plants described in 1929